Colonel Arthur Richard Cecil Butson, GC, OMM, CD and Bar (24 October 1922 – 24 March 2015) was born of British parents in China, and later emigrated to Canada.

A medical student during the Second World War, he then joined the Falkland Islands Dependencies Survey in 1946, and for rescuing another Antarctic explorer from a crevasse in 1947 was awarded the Albert Medal, then, with the George Cross, the highest award for civilian gallantry for British and Commonwealth citizens.  Later, all holders of the Albert Medal were invited to exchange that medal for the George Cross.

From 1948 he undertook postgraduate medical research in London before moving to Canada where he continued his medical career, both in civilian practice and with the Canadian Militia

Early life and Antarctic
Butson was born in Hankow, China of British parents on 24 October 1922.  He was educated in England at Leighton Park School and then at the University of Cambridge and University College Hospital, graduating MB, BChir in 1945.

He served in the Home Guard and a Light Rescue Squad in London during the Blitz and as a Medical Officer with the Falkland Islands Dependencies Survey in the Antarctic from 1946 to 1948. During his year in Antarctica, the expedition found a route for dog teams over the 5,000-foot high mountains of the Grahamland Peninsula and surveyed the last thousand miles of the most inaccessible coastline of the world.

For Bravery and Distinguished Service in Antarctica, Butson was awarded both the Albert Medal (later superseded by the George Cross) and the Polar Medal.

Butson's citation for the Albert Medal reads:

Butson's own description of events:

Canada
Butson did postgraduate surgical studies in London until 1952, when he emigrated to Canada, settling in Hamilton, Ontario in 1953, where he practiced as a surgeon. With the establishment of McMaster University Medical School in 1970, he joined the part-time faculty, ending with the appointment of Clinical Professor in the Department of Surgery. He was Chief of Staff of St. Joseph's Hospital, a 600-bed teaching hospital, for two years and Head of the Service of General Surgery for many years. He has published about 20 papers on surgical topics. He found time to obtain a Doctorate in addition to his medical degree.

Butson joined the Canadian Militia in 1956 as Medical Officer to the Royal Hamilton Light Infantry until 1972. He later commanded Hamilton's 23 Medical Company, with the rank of Lieutenant-Colonel. He was promoted Colonel and appointed the Area Surgeon for what is now LFCA (Land Force Central Area). Butson took the Arctic Winter Warfare course and qualified as a parachutist at age 55. He then established a Militia Airborne Surgical Team.

Butson was President of the Defence Medical Association of Canada and represented Canada medically on the NATO Reserve Officer's Association (CIOR) for four years. For his services to the Canadian Forces, he was appointed Honorary Surgeon to Her Majesty the Queen in 1977 and was made an Officer of the Order of Military Merit (Canada) in 1982.

Butson married Eileen Callon on 30 June 1967. They have two daughters, Sarah Louise and Caroline, and one son, Andrew Richard. Butson has been active with the St. John Ambulance for many years and was appointed Commander of the Venerable Order of Saint John on 14 April 2009.

He also received the Service Medal of the Order of St John for his long service with St John Ambulance.

A mountaineer, Butson climbed extensively in the Canadian Rockies, Baffin Island, the Antarctic, the Alps and the Hindu Kush in the Western Himalaya. Butson Ridge in Antarctica (at Lat 68°05’ S, Long 66°51’ W) is named after him.

In addition to the other medals mentioned above, Butson received the Defence Medal, the Queen Elizabeth II Silver Jubilee Medal in 1977, the Queen Elizabeth II Golden Jubilee Medal in 1992 (British and Canadian versions), and the Canadian Forces Decoration with Bar.

He worked as a beef cattle farmer in Ancaster, Ontario.

Politics
In 2003 Butson entered provincial politics in Ontario. Standing on principle, he stood as the sole candidate of the leaderless Confederation of Regions Party during the 2003 Ontario General Election. He stood Ancaster—Dundas—Flamborough—Aldershot, on a platform of individual freedom of responsibility, an affirmation of heritage, and a public referendum on bilingualism. He also opposed the forced amalgamation of Hamilton. 

As his party's sole candidate, Butson was interviewed by the CBC's Avril Benoit during the campaign. He received only 293 votes, finishing last in a field of six candidates.

Considered the de facto leader of the party, he was elected party president the following year and remained so until 2010. The following year his wife was elected by the party membership as the president of the party, succeeding her husband for a one-year term.

Private life 
Buston was married twice. In 1946 he married Joyce Scott Cowell, with whom he had two children. In 1967 he married, Eileen Gallon and they had a son.

Butson died at the age of 92 on 24 March 2015.

Medal entitlement
Butson was entitled to the following medals

References

External links
 http://www.rhli.ca/veterans/butson_gc.html

1922 births
2015 deaths
Recipients of the Polar Medal
British recipients of the George Cross
Canadian recipients of the George Cross
Canadian surgeons
Candidates in Ontario provincial elections
People from Hamilton, Ontario
Alumni of the University of Cambridge
Recipients of the Albert Medal (lifesaving)
Ontario Provincial Confederation of Regions Party politicians
Officers of the Order of Military Merit (Canada)
British expatriates in China
British emigrants to Canada